Football is the most popular sport in the country of Guinea. It is run by the Guinean Football Federation. The association administers the national football team, as well as the national league. It was founded in 1960 and affiliated with FIFA since 1962 and with the Confederation of African Football since 1963.

The Guinea national football team, nicknamed Syli nationale (National Elephants), have played international football since 1962. Their first opponent was East Germany. They have yet to reach a World Cup final, but they were runners-up to Morocco in the Africa Cup of Nations in 1976.

Guinée Championnat National is the top division of Guinean football. Since it was established in 1965, three teams have dominated in winning the Guinée Coupe Nationale. Horoya AC leads with 16 titles and is the current (2017-2018) champion. Hafia FC (known as Conakry II in 1960s) is second with 15 titles having dominated in 1960s and 70s, but the last coming in 1985. Third with 13 is AS Kaloum Star, known as Conakry I in the 1960s. All three teams are based in the capital, Conakry. No other team has more than five titles.

The 1970s were a golden decade for Guinean football. Hafia FC won the African Cup of Champions Clubs three times, in 1972, 1975 and 1977, while Horoya AC won the 1978 African Cup Winners' Cup.

Stadiums
Nongo Stadium, the home stadium of the national team, was opened in 2011 and has a capacity of 50,000. The Stade du 28 Septembre, constructed in 1962, can seat 25,000. Both these stadiums are located in Conakry. The Stade Régional Saifoullaye Diallo is in Labé, and can hold 5,000 fans. It is the home of Fello Star.

References

See also
 Guinea national football team results